The MusiCares COVID-19 Relief Fund was established in March 2020 during the COVID-19 pandemic to provide relief to music industry professionals that lost their jobs as a result of the pandemic. It was started when both MusiCares and The Recording Academy donated $1 million. By one month later, in April 2020, funds had been depleted. MusiCares received further donations from Amazon Music, Facebook, Sirius XM, Pandora Radio, Tidal, Spotify, and YouTube Music.

Applicants for relief must demonstrate three years of experience in the music industry. They must also provide a biography and proof of their involvement in canceled events. They can request up to $1,000.

Musicians are contributing to the fund through direct donations, songs, performances, and partnerships. Contributors include Josh Tillman, Dirty Projectors, Amanda Shires, Jason Isbell, Bandsintown, Troye Sivan, Alicia Keys, Blake Shelton and Yoshiki. Selena Gomez announced that a portion of the proceeds from "Dance Again" would go towards the fund.

References

External links
 

Charitable activities related to the COVID-19 pandemic
Fundraising events